Air Force Administrative College (AFAC), located at Coimbatore, is one of the oldest training institutes of the Indian Air Force (IAF).

Courses offered 
College conducts following courses for in service officers:
 Basic Air Typing Staff Course : Officers (BASCO)
 Intermediate Air Typing Staff Course : Officers (ISCO)
 Basic Professional Knowledge Course : Officers (BPKC)
 Advanced Professional Knowledge Course : Officers (APKC)
 Para Legal Course
Basic ground conversion of pilots

The College also conducts Meteorology branch related courses:
 Initial Forecasters’ Course (IFC)
 Advanced Met Courses for Met Tradesmen (SNCOs)
 2nd Stage Training of GDOC (Met)

See also
 Indian National Defence University
 Military Academies in India
 Sainik school

References 

Indian Air Force
Military education and training in India
Military academies of India
Educational institutions in India with year of establishment missing